VUI or Vui or variation, may refer to:

Computing
 Voice user interface, a voice/speech platform that enables human interaction with computers
 Video usability information, extra information that can be inserted into a video stream to enhance its use

Medicine and biology
 VUI – 202012/01, a "variant under investigation" of SARS-CoV-2, the virus which causes COVID-19
 Vattikuti Urology Institute, Henry Ford Hospital, Detroit, Michigan, USA

People
 Vui Florence Saulo, American Samoan businesswoman and politician
 Vui Manu'a, Western Samoan chief and politician
 Chris Vui (born 1983) New Zealand rugby footballer
 Shambeckler Vui (born 1997) Australian rugby player

See also